The 2014 Calderdale Metropolitan Borough Council election took place on 22 May 2014 to elect members of Calderdale Metropolitan Borough Council in England. This was on the same day as local elections across the United Kingdom and a European election. One councillor was elected in each of the 17 wards for a four-year term. There are three councillors representing each ward elected on a staggered basis so one third of the councillor seats were up for re-election. The seats had previously been contested in 2010 which was held in conjunction with a general election. The turnout was significantly lower in 2014 than in 2010 which is not unusual when comparing local elections that coincide with general elections to ones that do not. Prior to the election Labour was the largest party in the council with 21 out of 51 seats, 5 seats short of an overall majority. After the election there was no overall control of the council. Labour had 25 seats, only one short of a majority and so Labour continued to operate a minority administration.

In July 2014 a vote of no confidence was taken about the Labour minority administration. A surprise victory for the motion led to the Conservatives forming a minority administration.

All of the percentage changes in the tables below are expressed in relation to the election results in 2010 when the same candidates were up for election. The swings & changes are often smaller when compared to the election of the previous & subsequent councillors in the same wards in the 2012 & 2015 elections.

Council results

Council Composition
Prior to the election the composition of the council was:

After the election the composition of the council was:

Ward results

Brighouse ward

The incumbent was Colin Stout as an Independent.

Calder ward

The incumbent was Nader Fekri who stepped down at this election after defecting to Labour from the Liberal Democrats in 2012 saying that he could no longer support the coalition in the national parliament with the Conservatives.

Elland ward

The incumbent was David Hardy for the Liberal Democrats.

Greetland & Stainland ward

The incumbent was Conrad Winterburn for the Liberal Democrats who stood down at this election.

Hipperholme & Lightcliffe ward

The incumbent was Colin Raistrick as an Independent.

Illingworth & Mixenden ward

The incumbent was Daniel Sutherland for the Labour Party. The swing is expressed between Labour & UKIP.

Luddendenfoot ward

The incumbent was John Beacroft-Mitchell for the Liberal Democrats who stood down at this election.

Northowram & Shelf ward

The incumbent was Stephen Baines for the Conservative Party. The swing is expressed between the Conservative Party & UKIP.

Ovenden ward

The incumbent was Helen Rivron for the Labour Party.

Park ward

The incumbent was Ferman Ali for the Labour Party.

Rastrick ward

The incumbent was Christine Beal for the Conservative Party.

Ryburn ward

The incumbent was Kay Barret for the Conservative Party who stepped down at this election.

Skircoat ward

The incumbent was Pauline Nash for the Liberal Democrats.

Sowerby Bridge ward

The incumbent was Martin Peel for the Conservative Party who stood down at this election.

Todmorden ward

The incumbent was Ruth Goldthorpe for the Liberal Democrats who stepped down at this election.

Town ward

The incumbent was Bob Metcalfe for the Labour Party. The swing is expressed between Labour & Conservatives who were second in 2010.

Warley ward

The incumbent was Ashley Evans for the Liberal Democrats.

References

2014 English local elections
2014
2010s in West Yorkshire